Rame is a hamlet between Rame Head and the village of Cawsand in South East Cornwall. It is situated on the Rame Peninsula. Rame means the high protruding cliff, or possibly, the ram's head.

Cawsand was previously in the parish of Rame  but now has its own church. The parish of 'Maker-with-Rame' is formed of the hamlets Maker, which also has a church and Rame. Rame was recorded in the Domesday Book of 1086, when it was held by Ermenhald from Tavistock Abbey.  There were 27 households, land for 6 ploughs, 10 acres of pasture and 30 acres of underwood. An electoral division bearing the same name also existed, but was succeeded by the Rame Peninsula division. The population as of the 2011 census was 4,763.

There is another Rame near Falmouth in west Cornwall. It is believed that the west Cornwall Rame was named after the one on the Rame Peninsula.

During his time in command of the Channel Fleet between 1805 and 1807 John Jervis, 1st Earl of St Vincent rented a house in Rame.

Parish church

The church in the hamlet is dedicated to St. Germanus, the fighting bishop who is supposed to have landed in the neighbourhood when he came to Britain to suppress the Pelagian heresy in 400. The site however is also an ancient Cornish pagan holy site. Built of rough slate, the present stone building was consecrated in 1259. The slender, un-buttressed tower with its broached spire (an unusual feature in a Cornish church), the north wall and the chancel are all probably of this date, when the church was cruciform in shape. A southern aisle was added in the 15th century and the Norman tympanum is a relic of the earlier church building on the site. The church is not supplied with electricity and so is lit by candles.

References

External links

 Village Holiday Information

Villages in Cornwall
Manors in Cornwall